Alexander Vladimirovich Zevakhin (born June 4, 1980) is a Russian professional ice hockey right winger currently playing for Titan Klin in the Russian Major League. He was drafted 54th overall in the 1998 NHL Entry Draft by the Pittsburgh Penguins.

Career statistics

External links

1980 births
Living people
Amur Khabarovsk players
HC CSKA Moscow players
HC MVD players
Molot-Prikamye Perm players
Pittsburgh Penguins draft picks
Russian ice hockey right wingers
Salavat Yulaev Ufa players
Severstal Cherepovets players
SKA Saint Petersburg players
Torpedo Nizhny Novgorod players
Wilkes-Barre/Scranton Penguins players
Sportspeople from Perm, Russia